Holocausto are a heavy metal band from Belo Horizonte, Brazil. They were formed in 1985 by Marco Antônio, Valério Exterminator and Rodrigo dos Anjos. To date they have released five records through Cogumelo Records. They have been described by the journalist Eduardo Rivadavia as "Quite possibly the most controversial Brazilian heavy metal band ever".

History
Holocausto were formed in 1985 by Marco Antônio (bass), Valério Exterminator (vocals and guitar) and Rodrigo dos Anjos (guitar). After recording a demo (Massacre, 1985) and contributing to Cogumelo's Warfare Noise I, the band caused controversy with their 1987 debut record, Campo de Extermínio. Whilst previous South American bands, such as Sepultura, Vulcano and Sarcófago had toyed with anti-Christian sentiment and Satanism, Holocausto used vivid descriptions of Nazi atrocities in the concentration camps, leading to accusations of antisemitism. The band have claimed that they were "only trying to expose the horrors of the Holocaust in all its gruesome detail" and "that the album's shocking and unflinching descriptions were simply meant to show their own revulsion to the events that had inspired their name".

The band continued with numerous line-up changes, releasing a series of albums through Cogumelo Records, without capitalizing on their early notoriety. 1988's Blocked Minds and 1990's Negatives were thrash-oriented and stylistically similar to Voivod's music, while 1993's Tozago as Deismno carried an industrial influence. These albums proved a lack of success for the band, that has been ascribed to their line-up difficulties and their late adoption of English lyrics and the subject matter of their debut. They did however reform in 2004, releasing a new hardcore-tinged album (De Volta ao Front) in 2005.

On April 1, 2017, Holocausto released an extended play titled War Metal Massacre, returning to their black metal origins.

The band's sixth studio album, Diário de Guerra, was released on July 31, 2019.

Members
Final Line-Up
 Rodrigo Führer – lead vocals (1985-1987, 2015–2018), drums (1988-1994, 2004–2015)
 Valério Exterminator – guitar (1985-1987, 2004–2018), lead vocals (2004-2015)
 Anderson Guerrilheiro – bass (1986-1989, 2004–2018), lead vocals (1988-1989)
 Armando Nuclear Soldier – drums (1987, 2017–2018)

Former
 Marco Antônio – bass (1985-1986; died 1986)
 Renato da Costa – guitar (1988-1992)
 João Marcelo – bass (1989-1994)
 Rossano Polla – vocals (1989-1994)
 Rodrigo dos Anjos – guitar (1992-1994)
 Nedson Warfare – drums (1985-1987, 2015–2017)

Timeline

Discography
 Massacre demo (1985)
 Warfare Noise I split LP (with Chakal, Mutilator, and Sarcófago; Cogumelo, 1986)
 Campo de Extermínio LP (Cogumelo, 1987)
 Blocked Minds LP (Cogumelo, 1988)
 Australoptecus Experience demo (Cogumelo, 1990)
 Negatives LP (Cogumelo, 1990)
 Tozago as Deismno LP (Cogumelo, 1993)
 De Volta ao Front LP (Cogumelo, 2005)
 Campo de Exterminio Show - 1987 DVD (Cogumelo, 2007)
War Metal Massacre EP (Nuclear War Now!, 2017)
Diário de Guerra LP (Nuclear War Now!, 2019)

References

External links
 Official website
 Youtube Channel
 Instagram

Musical groups established in 1985
Brazilian thrash metal musical groups
Brazilian black metal musical groups
1985 establishments in Brazil